The 2008 Manx Grand Prix was held between 18 and 30 August on the Mountain Course. The Senior event was won by the Welsh rider Adam Barclay, and the Junior and Ultra-Lightweight events by the Manx rider Dan Kneen, who also scored the fastest lap in three different races.

Results

Practice times

2008 Senior Manx Grand Prix Practice Times and Leaderboard

Race results

Race 1; Newcomers Race A
Monday 25 August 2008 – Mountain Course  2 laps – 75.46 miles (121.40 km).
 Four-stroke Four-cylinder motorcycles exceeding 550 cc and not exceeding 750 cc.
 Four-stroke Twin-cylinder motorcycles exceeding 651 cc and not exceeding 1000 cc.
 Four-stroke Three-cylinder motorcycles exceeding 601 cc and not exceeding 675 cc.

Fastest Lap: Ryan Kneen – 104.005 mph (21' 45.97) on lap 2.

Race 1; Newcomers Race C
Monday 25 August 2008 – Mountain Course  2 laps – 75.46 miles (121.40 km).
 Two-stroke motorcycles exceeding 125 cc and 6 gears.
 Four-stroke motorcycles exceeding 251 cc and not exceeding 400 cc.
 Four-stroke Twin-cylinder motorcycles not exceeding 650 cc.

Fastest Lap: Daniel Kneen – 96.829 mph (23' 22.76) on lap 2.

Race 2; Senior Classic Race
Monday 25 August 2008 – Mountain Course 3 laps – 113.00 miles (181.96 km)
 For motorcycles exceeding 351 cc and not exceeding 500 cc.

Fastest Lap: Ryan Farquhar – 103.572 mph (21' 51.44)

Race 3; Junior Classic Race
Wednesday 27 August 2008 – Mountain Course 3 laps – 113.00 miles (181.96 km)
 Class A for motorcycles exceeding 300 cc and not exceeding 350 cc.

Fastest Lap; Roy Richardson – 22 minutes 23.71 seconds  101.084 mph

Race 3; Lightweight Classic Race
Wednesday 27 August 2008 – Mountain Course 3 laps – 113.00 miles (181.96 km)
 Class B for motorcycles exceeding 175 cc and not exceeding 250 cc.

Fastest Lap; Ewan Hamilton – 23 minutes 57.29 seconds  94.503 mph

Race 4; Junior Manx Grand Prix
Wednesday 27 August 2008 – Mountain Course 3 laps – 113.00 miles (181.96 km)
 Two-stroke motorcycles exceeding 201 cc and not exceeding 250 cc.
 Four-stroke four-cylinder motorcycles exceeding 550 cc and not exceeding 600 cc.
 Four-stroke twin-cylinder motorcycles exceeding 651 cc and not exceeding 750 cc.

Fastest Lap; Michael Weldon – 19 minutes 20.88 seconds  117.004 mph

Race 5; Senior Manx Grand Prix
Saturday  30 August 2008 – Mountain Course  2 laps – 75.46 miles (121.40 km) – Reduced Race Distance.
 Four-stroke Four-cylinder motorcycles exceeding 550 cc and not exceeding 750 cc.
 Four-stroke Twin-cylinder motorcycles exceeding 651 cc and not exceeding 1000 cc.
 Four-stroke Three-cylinder motorcycles exceeding 601 cc and not exceeding 675 cc.

Fastest Lap: Adam Barclay – 119.996 mph (18' 51.94) on lap 2.

Race 6a; Lightweight Manx Grand Prix
Saturday  30 August 2008 – Mountain Course  3 laps – 113.00 miles (181.96 km) – Reduced Race Distance.
 Two-stroke motorcycles 201 cc – 350 cc

Nigel Moore- 19 minutes 54.71 seconds  113.691 mph

Race 6b; Ultra-Lightweight Manx Grand Prix
Saturday  30 August 2008 – Mountain Course  3 laps – 113.00 miles (181.96 km) – Reduced Race Distance.
 Two-stroke motorcycles up to 125 cc, 6 gears maximum.
 Four-stroke motorcycles 251 cc – 401 cc
 Up to 650 cc Four-stroke twin-cylinder.

Fastest Lap Daniel Kneen – 21 minutes 01.59 seconds  107.664 mph.

Sources

External links
 Detailed race results
 Mountain Course map

2008
2008 in British motorsport
Manx
Manx